The Securities and Exchange Commission of Pakistan (SECP) is the financial regulatory agency in Pakistan whose objective is to develop a modern and efficient corporate sector and a capital market based on sound authority principles, in order to encourage investment and foster economic growth and prosperity in Pakistan.

The SECP is a collegiate body with collective responsibility. The operational and executive authority of the SECP is vested in the Chairman who is the SECP's chief executive officer (CEO). The Chairman is assisted by four Commissioners to oversee the working of various operational units as may be determined by him. The SECP has nine company registration offices located at in Islamabad, Karachi, Lahore, Multan, Peshawar, Sukkur, Faisalabad, Quetta and Gilgit-Baltistan.

History
The Securities and Exchange Commission of Pakistan (SECP) is the successor to the erstwhile Corporate Law Authority (CLA), which was an attached department of the Ministry of Finance. The process of the CLA's restructuring was started in 1997 under the Capital Market Development Plan of the Asian Development Bank (ADB). The parliament passed the Securities and Exchange Commission of Pakistan Act, which was promulgated in December 1997. Consequently, the SECP, having an autonomous status, became operational on January 1, 1999. The Act gave the organization the administrative authority and financial autonomy to carry out the reform program for Pakistan's capital market.

The scope of the authority of the SECP has been gradually widened. The insurance sector, non-banking financial companies, and pension funds have been added to the purview of the SECP. Now the SECP's mandate includes investment financial services, leasing companies, housing finance services, venture capital investment, discounting services, investment advisory services, real estate investment trust and asset management services, etc. The SECP also regulates various external service providers that are linked to the corporate sector, like chartered accountants, rating agencies, insurance companies, corporate secretaries and others.

Divisions 
The SECP is divided into the following divisions:

 Adjudication Division
 Company Law Division
 Insurance Division
 Legal Affairs Division
 Securities Market Division
 Specialized Companies Division
 Supervision Division
 Support Services Division

See also
Corporate sector of Pakistan
Economy of Pakistan
Karachi Stock Exchange
Lahore Stock Exchange
Islamabad Stock Exchange
International Financial Reporting Standards
Securities Commission
List of company registers
Pakistan Stock Exchange

References

External links
Securities and Exchange Commission of Pakistan Website
SECP Corporate Laws

Financial regulatory authorities of Pakistan
Securities and exchange commissions
1999 establishments in Pakistan
Government agencies established in 1999